Farajabad (also Romanized as Farajābād; also known as Eshkaft-e Manā) is a village in Hati Rural District, Hati District, Lali County, Khuzestan Province, Iran. At the 2006 census, its population was 95, in 15 families.

References 

Populated places in Lali County